David Henry Conville OBE (4 June 1929 – 24 November 2018) was a British actor and director at the Regent's Park Open Air Theatre.

He was the son of Lt. Col. Leopold Conville who farmed in Sahiwal Punjab on land that is now in Pakistan. He was married to Philippa Gail from 1970 till her death in 1999.

Filmography

References

External links 

1929 births
2018 deaths
British actors
British theatre directors
Members of the Order of the British Empire